Acianthus exsertus, commonly known as gnat orchid or large mosquito orchid, is a species of flowering plant in the orchid family Orchidaceae and is endemic to eastern Australia. It is a terrestrial herb with a single, heart-shaped leaf and up to 25 small, fine, dark brown flowers with pinkish and purplish markings and is found growing in sheltered places in forests in Queensland, New South Wales the ACT and Victoria.

Description
Acianthus exsertus is a terrestrial, perennial, deciduous, sympodial herb with a single heart-shaped, glabrous, dark green leaf that is reddish-purple on its lower surface.

The thick, fleshy callus has many small pimple-like papillae on the outer half. Flowering occurs from March to August.

This species is distinguished from other mosquito orchids by its relatively large, well-spaced, dark coloured flowers and by the dorsal sepal which does not cover the column.

Taxonomy and naming
Acianthus exsertus was first formally described by Robert Brown in 1810 and the description was published in Prodromus Florae Novae Hollandiae. The specific epithet (exsertus) is a Latin word meaning to "stretch out" or "thrust out".

Distribution and habitat
This orchid is widespread and locally common, sometimes in coastal areas but more usually on the ranges and tablelands in sheltered forest and woodland, growing in well-drained soil.

Conservation
Acianthus exsertus is not threatened in New South Wales.

References

External links 
 

exsertus
Orchids of New South Wales
Orchids of Queensland
Orchids of Victoria (Australia)
Endemic orchids of Australia
Plants described in 1810
Taxa named by Robert Brown (botanist, born 1773)